The Smartlink Day of Rivals is an annual college lacrosse double-header event played in Baltimore, Maryland, USA, between two pairs of traditional rivals. The event takes place in M&T Bank Stadium, the home field of the Baltimore Ravens of the National Football League. The first event took place on April 11, 2009, between the Johns Hopkins–Maryland and Army–Navy games, the two most intense and storied lacrosse rivalries. The 2010 event featured the same match-ups with a total attendance of 20,911.

Johns Hopkins declined to extend its contract with the event for the 2011 edition, and will instead play Maryland at Homewood Field. Similarly, the Army–Navy game will be held at Annapolis in 2011 instead.

Results

See also
List of college lacrosse events

References

External links
Day of Rivals official website
Lacrosse's Day of Rivals, The New York Times, April 10, 2009.
Johns Hopkins Renews Commitment to Face-Off Classic, Adds Day of Rivals to Schedule, Johns Hopkins University, July 14, 2008.
Day of Rivals: History on Display, NCAA, April 9, 2009.
Navy: Day of Rivals to include Army-Navy Men's Lacrosse Battle, NCAA, July 14, 2008.
Smartlink Day of Rivals: Johns Hopkins-Maryland the Grandaddy of them all, Inside Lacrosse, April 8, 2009.

College lacrosse competitions in the United States
Recurring sporting events established in 2009
2009 establishments in Maryland
Lacrosse in Baltimore